The 1998–99 Montreal Canadiens season was the club's 90th season of play. The club finished 5th in the Northeast Division and did not qualify for the Stanley Cup playoffs. It had been the worst season in over 48 years for the club. The Canadiens finished last in their division. Martin Rucinsky led the club with 17 goals. It was the first time since the 1940–41 season that the Canadiens did not have at least one 20-goal scorer. On March 31, 1999, ownership announced it has lost $3.8 million in its last fiscal year. Following the season, team president Ronald Corey resigned in May 1999.

Regular season
In March 1999, Captain Vincent Damphousse was traded to the San Jose Sharks.

Final standings

Schedule and results

Player statistics

Regular season
Scoring

Goaltending

Awards and records

Transactions

Draft picks
Montreal's draft picks at the 1998 NHL Entry Draft held at the Marine Midland Arena in Buffalo, New York.

See also
 1998–99 NHL season

References
Bibliography
 
 Canadiens on Hockey Database
 Canadiens on NHL Reference

Montreal Canadiens seasons
Montreal Canadiens season, 1998-99
Montreal